Isaac Elchanan Mozeson (born 1951) is best known for his research and writings
about the origin of languages.

Early life
In a 1990 interview he traced his area of interest to a "lasting impression" by having "heard his grade school Rebbe recount the Torah story
of the Tower of Bavel" and talking of "a common language."

Mozeson was born 1951 in British Columbia to "Rabbi and Mrs. Leon M. Mozeson of Portland, Me." The family moved to Brookline, Massachusetts, where he attended the Maimonides School and graduated 1969.

Mozeson's subsequent formal education is from Yeshiva University NYU "and at the Erna Michael College of Hebraic Studies." He and his wife Lois married in 1978; they adopted and raised two children.

The Word: The Dictionary that Reveals the Hebrew Source of English
Mozeson's ten years of work on The Word: The Dictionary that Reveals the Hebrew Source of English began "while working on his doctorate at NYU." The Dictionarys foundation had early challengers, including his PhD advisor, who called some of his examples "a coincidence." The author of The Dictionary of Word Origins, Joseph Shipley, died prior to the publication of the work but was quoted as saying "The Word is a challenge to linguistics" and added "The parallels traced seem beyond the range of coincidence." The linguist David L. Gold, however, was extremely critical of Mozeson's work, writing, "Possibly every error imaginable in the study of language was committed in this dictionary, which should be read, if at all, as an antitextbook of linguistics, to be studied not for emulation but for avoidance."

The Origin Of Speeches: Intelligent Design in Language
Mozeson's The Origin Of Speeches: Intelligent Design in Language has a Tower of Babel drawing with a subheading that refers to "The Language of Eden." The book asks why "belief that blind chance endowed human beings with the sense and physiology to devise a highly complex system of expression" is widely given more acceptance than belief in the Bible's account of the Tower of Babel.

Edenics controversy
Edenics is Mozeson's description regarding speech in the Garden of Eden as the original human language and that "human language did not evolve by accident." A Jewish Press book review of Mozeson's The Origin Of Speeches: Intelligent Design in Language used the word Edenic more than once but did not use his term Edenics; neither did a satire published in The Algemeiner Journal about the naming of the book "Origin of the Speeches" as similar to Charles Darwin's The Origin of Species. The latter even rejects the term in the singular, writing that "Isaac Mozeson, a Ph.D. in linguistics from NYU ... hypothesizes a primal, universal language that he calls Edenic (and others might call proto-Semitic or ancient Hebrew)." It also refers to PIE after citing Mozeson's "Proto-Indo-European" and states about "Dr. Mozeson and a team of researchers" that "they have no idea if the language ever existed." The satire supports the concept of a single universal tongue, and uses examples from
modern Hebrew.

Other works
He is the co-author of Wars of the Jews: A Military History from Biblical to Modern Times and a senior editor for The Jewish Heritage Writing Project.

In 1994 Mozeson and his wife co-authored Jerusalem Mosaic: Young Voices from the Holy City. A 2001 curriculcum guide describes it as "Gr. 8-12. Jewish and Arab teens talk about their lives in Jerusalem and their hopes for the future." The 1909-founded American Academy of Religion lists the book in its "Guidelines for Teaching About Religion in K-12 Public Schools in the United States" as "Recommended for grades 6-12" and writes "Jewish, Christian, and Muslim perspectives from varying positions on the secular-orthodox spectrum."

Mozeson's other works include:
 Beginner's Hebrew Word Book: An Illustrated Dictionary
 A 2 Z: The Book of Rap and Hip-hop Slang (co-authored)
 Voices and Faces of Homeless Teens (co-authored)

References

External links
 Cover, Mozeson's The Origin of Speeches: Intelligent Design in Language
 Mozeson's web site (edenics.net)

20th-century American male writers
21st-century American male writers
New York University alumni
Yeshiva University alumni